Sharks Took the Rest are a British alternative pop band brought together by Beccy Owen and Adam Kent. The band are based in the North East of England and write original songs that incorporate influences from many different genres, including pop, Alternative Rock, Jazz, Ambient music, Electronic music, Classical music, Folk and Trip hop. On their website they describe their music as creating "blissful, panoramic pop out of lush, chamber-style textures, swoonsome female vocals and an artful dash of electronica". 

The Journal newspaper described their music as "sublime bliss"  while the National Student Magazine described them as "coming on like a cross between Joanna Newsom fronting an unplugged Cocteau Twins" and that "these guys could be your new favourite band within five minutes".

Their first self-funded EP Grounds For Hearts To Swell was released on 14 February 2011 and garnered radio play on BBC radio including Tom Robinson (BBC 6 music), Nemone (BBC 6 music - single of the week) and Iain Anderson amongst others. Following this they were invited to London to perform on the 'Loose Ends' show  on Radio 4 with Clive Anderson. They were also invited to and played at Glastonbury 2011 on the BBC Introducing Stage.

The band's first full album, Too Late for Logic, was released on 2 July 2013 on Bandcamp.

Two of the original band members (Nick Pride and Ian 'Dodge' Paterson) are also members of Nick Pride and the Pimptones, a Newcastle based funk and soul band who are currently signed to Italian funk label Record Kicks.

In 2013 Sharks Took The Rest disbanded with a new electro-pop quartet Joy Atlas being formed from three of the founding members.

Band members 
The original 2011 line-up for Sharks Took the Rest was:

 Beccy Owen — lead vocals
 Adam Kent — keyboards, electronica
 Rebecca Topping — cello, backing vocals
 Louise Taylor — viola
 Nick Pride — guitar
 Ian 'dodge' Paterson — bass, double bass
 David Carnegie — drums, backing vocals

By 2013 they had become a four-piece, consisting of:

 Beccy Owen — lead vocals
 Adam Kent — keyboards, electronica
 Adam Sinclair — drums, backing vocals
 Ian 'dodge' Paterson — bass, double bass

Gallery

References

External links 

 

British electronic music groups
Musical groups from Newcastle upon Tyne